World Skill Center Bhubaneswar (also known as WSC Bhubaneswar) is proposed to be a 20-floor-tall building in Bhubaneswar, Odisha, India. This will be the 2n World Trade Centre to be operationalized in India. It is developed by Populous (company). The center will consist of 200 room hotel, 50,000 sq ft of indoor exhibition hall, multipurpose convention hall to accommodate 4,000 delegates, small convertible meeting halls to host 12 to 16 events simultaneously, an open area to accommodate up to 25,000 people and an open amphitheater. Upon completion, the World skill Center Bhubaneswar will be the tallest building in Odisha. The Convention Center will be connected to all nearby hotels at Kantabada ,Jhadapada  and the World Skill Center through a skywalk & a helipad. For now, the World Skill Center Bhubaneswar is functioning from IDCO Towers, in Manecheswar, Bhubaneswar, Odisha

Initiatives and activities
WTC Bhubaneswar (2018) Corporate Social Responsibility Orientation Programme at Indian Oil Corporation Paradip 
WTC Bhubaneswar (2018) Celebration of International Women's Day
WTC Bhubaneswar (2018) WTC Bhubaneswar at MSME Trade Fair
WTC Bhubaneswar (2018) WTCB as Industry Interface for National Startup Week at Sri Sri University 
WTC Bhubaneswar (2018) WTC Budget Conclave with XIMB
WTC Bhubaneswar (2018) WTC Bhubaneswar Partners with IT Conclave 2018
WTC Bhubaneswar (2018) Industry Interaction Session on Business Opportunities with Republic of Uganda

Media coverage
Odisha Diary (2018) Indian Oil Corporation and WTC Organised CSR Orientation Programme in Paradip
Odisha Diary (2018) Odisha Govt promoted the trade and business potentials of the State at Global Economic Summit-2018
Odisha Diary (2018) World Trade Centre and XIMB to organize a budget review
Navaratna News (2018) World Trade Centre Global Economic Summit-2018 
Odisha Diary (2018) World Trade Centre, Bhubaneswar Organises Social Entrepreneurship Workshop
Odisha News Insight (2017) WTC felicitates Women Achievers
Times of India (2017) World Trade Centre to be ready by 2019
Symbiosis Institute of International Business (2015) Entrepreneurship Development Program (EDP)
The Hindu (2014) World Trade Centre in Bhubaneswar expected to spur trade, tourism
Information and Public Relations (I&PR) Department, Government of Odisha (2013)On Offing: World Trade Centre at Bhubaneswar

See also
 List of world trade centers
 List of tallest buildings in Bhubaneswar

References

External links
 World Trade Center Bhubaneswar
 Trading Floor in Bhubaneswar

World Trade Centers
Buildings and structures in Bhubaneswar
Economy of Bhubaneswar
Proposed skyscrapers in India